Arabis may refer to:
 Arabis, a flowering plant genus
 Arabis-class sloop, the third class of minesweeping sloops of the Royal Navy in World War I
 HMNZS Arabis (K 385), a Royal New Zealand Navy corvette
 HMS Arabis, various ships of the Royal Navy
 1087 Arabis, a minor planet
 Arabis or Arabius, ancient name for the Hub River